Dog's eye may refer to:

 The eye of a dog
 A meat pie (British and Australian rhyming slang)
 Dog's Eye View, an American rock band